Sean Fleming (born March 19, 1970) is a former professional Canadian football placekicker and punter. Fleming was drafted sixth overall by the Canadian Football League's Edmonton Eskimos out of the University of Wyoming in the 1992 CFL Draft. He attended Vancouver College when he was in high school.

Fleming played sixteen seasons in the Canadian Football League, all with the Eskimos. He is a four-time CFL West Division All-Star (twice named CFL All-Star) and three-time Eskimos nominee for Most Outstanding Canadian. He has played in five Grey Cups, winning three, and was named the 81st Grey Cup's Most Valuable Canadian. He kicked the game-winning field goal in overtime for the Eskimos in the 93rd Grey Cup. Fleming holds the Eskimos' records for points (2,571), field goals (553), converts (713), punts (1,264), punt yardage (52,957) and kickoff yardage (69,973). Fleming was inducted into the club's Wall of Honour in 2011.

References

1970 births
Living people
Canadian football placekickers
Canadian football punters
Edmonton Elks players
Players of Canadian football from British Columbia
Sportspeople from Burnaby
Wyoming Cowboys football players